SMS Fürst Bismarck (Prince Bismarck) was Germany's first armored cruiser, built for the Kaiserliche Marine before the turn of the 20th century. The ship was named for the German statesman Otto von Bismarck. The design for Fürst Bismarck was an improvement over the previous  protected cruisers—Fürst Bismarck was significantly larger and better armed than her predecessors.

The ship was primarily intended for colonial duties, and she served in this capacity as part of the East Asia Squadron until she was relieved in 1909, at which point she returned to Germany. The ship was rebuilt between 1910 and 1914, and after the start of World War I, she was briefly used as a coastal defense ship. She proved inadequate to this task, and so she was withdrawn from active duty and served as a training ship for engineers until the end of the war. Fürst Bismarck was decommissioned in 1919 and sold for scrap.

Design 
Fürst Bismarck was designed before the naval arms race between Germany and the United Kingdom. Admiral Hollmann was the State Secretary of the Naval Office at the time. Given the dominance of the British Royal Navy and the impossibility, as he saw it, of competing with it, Hollmann envisaged a small fleet consisting of torpedo boats and coastal defense ships to be based in German waters. This would be supplemented by a number of cruisers for overseas duties, including trade protection.

The first armored cruiser to be designed by the German navy, Fürst Bismarck was an enlarged version of the s, at nearly twice the displacement and with a significantly more powerful armament. The ship was intended for overseas use, particularly in support of German colonies in Asia and the Pacific. Despite heavy political opposition, the new ship was approved by the Reichstag and construction began in 1896.

General characteristics and machinery

She had a draft of  forward and  aft. However, the ship suffered from serious roll problems and heavy vibration at higher speeds.

The lower portions of the ship, including the stem and the stern, were covered with bronze plating. The ship had 13 watertight compartments and a double bottom that ran for 59 percent of the length of the hull.

Fürst Bismarck was propelled by three vertical four-cylinder, triple-expansion engines. The engines were powered by four Thornycroft boilers—which had been built under license by Germaniawerft—and 8 cylindrical boilers. The Thornycroft boilers had two fire boxes apiece, for a total of eight, while the cylindrical boilers each had four fire boxes, for a total of 32. Each of the three engines drove a three-bladed screw propeller. Electrical power was supplied by five generators that provided 325 kilowatts at 110 volts.

Armament 

Fürst Bismarcks primary armament consisted of a battery of four 24 cm (9.4 in) SK L/40 guns in twin-gun turrets, one fore and one aft of the central superstructure. The guns were mounted in Drh.L. C/98 turrets, which allowed elevation to 30° and depression to −5°. The ship stored 312 rounds, for a total of 78 shells per gun.

The secondary armament consisted of twelve  SK L/40 quick-firing guns in MPL type casemates. These guns fired armor-piercing shells at a rate of 4 to 5 per minute. The ships carried 120 shells per gun, for a total of 2,160 rounds total. The guns could depress to −7 degrees and elevate to 20 degrees, for a maximum range of 13,700 m (14,990 yd). The guns were manually elevated and trained.

For defense against torpedo boats, the ship also carried ten  SK L/30 guns in a combination of individual casemates and pivot mounts. The gun mounts were manually operated.

Six  torpedo tubes were also fitted, with a total of 16 torpedoes. One tube was fitted to a swivel mount on the stern of the ship, four were submerged on the broadside, and the sixth was placed in the bow, also submerged.

Armor 
Fürst Bismarck was protected with Krupp armor, which was in some cases thicker than that of subsequent designs. The main battery turret sides were 20 cm thick and the roofs were 4 cm thick. The 15 cm turrets had 10 cm sides and  gun shields. The casemated guns had 10 cm shields.

Even , Germany's last armored cruiser, only had a  armored belt and 18 cm-thick turret faces, though her overall scale of protection was much more comprehensive than Fürst Bismarcks.

Service history 

Her completed hull was launched on 25 September 1897, where she was christened after former Chancellor Otto von Bismarck. While the shipyard was completing the fitting-out work for the new armored cruiser on 2 March 1900, the ironclad  accidentally collided with Fürst Bismarck, slightly damaging her stern. The accident delayed the start of sea trials until 19 March. Initial testing revealed the need for alterations to the ship, but the outbreak of the Boxer Uprising in China in late 1899 prevented the work from being done, as the German East Asia Squadron required reinforcement. Accordingly, on 30 June the ship left Kiel for East Asia, stopping to refuel at Gibraltar and at Port Said and Port Tewfik, at both ends of the Suez Canal. While passing through the Red Sea, 41 members of her crew suffered from heat-related illness. Fürst Bismarck stopped in Perim at the southern end of the Red Sea and then crossed the Indian Ocean to Colombo, Ceylon before proceeding to Singapore.

East Asia Squadron

Boxer Uprising

In Singapore on 4 August, the ship received orders to escort the troop ships Frankfurt and Wittekind to Tsingtao, the capital of the German Kiautschou Bay concession in China. The three ships arrived there on 13 August, and four days later,  (VAdm—Vice Admiral) Emil Felix von Bendemann, the commander of the East Asia Squadron, transferred his flag from the protected cruiser  to Fürst Bismarck. German forces contributed 24 warships and 17,000 soldiers to the Eight Nation Alliance, which assembled 250 warships and 70,000 soldiers in total to combat the Boxers. An agreement with Russia saw the German  (Field Marshal) Alfred von Waldersee placed in command of the multinational force.

Bendemann decided to implement a blockade of the Yangtze, and so went there with Fürst Bismarck, Gefion, Irene, and the gunboat , as well as the ships of the Detached Division, though he sent the battleship  to cover the landing of troops at Taku. Landing parties from the ships went ashore in Shanghai to protect Europeans there. Bendemann sent Seeadler and Schwalbe up the Yangtze to protect German, Austro-Hungarian, and Belgian nationals upriver, Bussard to Amoy, and Luchs and S91 to Canton. Bendemann based his flagship in Shanghai, and on 25 September, Hertha arrived with the new German ambassador to China, Alfons Mumm von Schwarzenstein to meet with Bendemann before proceeding on to Peking. By this time, Allied forces had seized Peitsang at the mouth of the Peiho river, but the port frequently froze over in the winter, so additional harbors were necessary to adequately supply the forces fighting ashore. Bendemann therefore took most of his fleet to attack the ports of Shanhaiguan and Qinhuangdao, since they had rail connections to Taku and Peking. Bendemann issued an ultimatum to surrender to the Chinese defenders of the cities, both of which accepted, allowing the Alliance to take both cities without a fight. Beginning in late October, the naval forces of the Eight Nation Alliance concentrated on the mouth of the Yangtze. Britain and Germany both suspected the other of attempting to secure a permanent occupation of the area, though both suspicions proved to be false. In November, Fürst Bismarck went to Nagasaki, Japan for engine maintenance, temporarily transferring Bendemann to Kaiserin Augusta while she was away for repairs.

By February 1901, the fighting had decreased to the point that the ships of the East Asia Squadron could resume the normal routine of individual and squadron training exercises. In May, Seeadler was detached to Yap in the Caroline Islands, and in June, Hansa carried  (KAdm—Rear Admiral) Hermann Kirchhoff to Sydney and Melbourne, Australia. Also in June, the Detached Division, Irene, and Gefion returned to Germany. The following month, the East Asia Squadron returned to its normal peacetime footing. Fürst Bismarck visited Japanese ports with Geier, S91, and S92 in mid-1901, and in September, she and S91 visited Port Arthur in Russian Manchuria before returning to Japanese waters in October. Another shipyard period in Nagasaki followed, which included repairs to her frequently-leaky stern. By this time, the Chinese government had signed the Boxer Protocol on 7 September, formally ending the conflict. The experience of projecting significant military power over such a great distance proved to be invaluable to the German army and navy and it made particularly clear the importance of logistics.

1902–1905

Fürst Bismarck completed repairs in Nagasaki on 15 January 1902 and in early February she rendezvoused with Hertha and Bussard in Singapore. There, Bendemann returned to the ship, though days later on 15 February, he turned command of the squadron over to VAdm Richard Geissler. Later that month, the light cruiser  joined the squadron; further changes to the composition of the squadron followed shortly thereafter, with Kaiserin Augusta, S91, and S92 returning to Germany in February and March. In April, Schwalbe, Geier, and Luchs went to Ning Po to protect Europeans from unrest in the city while Fürst Bismarck and the rest of the squadron toured East Asian ports, ranging from Japan to the Dutch East Indies. During this period, they also conducted various training exercises and alternated visits to Tsingtao and Japan for periodic maintenance. Schwalbe returned to Germany in September, though her place was taken by Geier.

In early 1903, Fürst Bismarck anchored off the mouth of the Yangtze with Hansa and Thetis, remaining there until mid-March before proceeding to Tsingtao. The ship visited Japan in company with Bussard, where Geissler and his staff were received by Emperor Meiji. The two ships then made a visit to the Russian Pacific Fleet, based in Vladivostok, in early August. On 15 November, KAdm Curt von Prittwitz und Gaffron replaced Geissler as the squadron commander, after which Fürst Bismarck returned to Nagasaki for another overhaul in December.

The year 1904 began with exercises and visits to ports in the region. Over the course of 20–23 January, Hansa evacuated German and Austro-Hungarian citizens from Port Arthur and Dalny. Japan severed diplomatic relations with Russia on 5 February and attacked the Russian fleet in Port Arthur in a surprise nighttime attack on 8/9 February without having declared war. On 12 February, Hansa returned to Port Arthur to remove the last of the civilians from the city, and Thetis was sent to Chemulpo to do the same on 21–22 February. After the Battle of the Yellow Sea on 10 August, several damaged Russian ships sought refuge in Tsingtao, including the battleship  and the cruiser , where they were interned for the remainder of the Russo-Japanese War. For the rest of the war, Fürst Bismarck and the East Asia Squadron were primarily occupied with enforcing the internment of the ship and destroying Russian naval mines that threatened German shipping.

During the war, the squadron continued its normal training routine, and Fürst Bismarck won the Schießpreis again that year. She, Hertha, and Seeadler were present in Shanghai for the opening of a German club in the city. In early 1905, riots in China forced most of the squadron to remain in Chinese ports until March. Prittwitz und Gaffron recalled his ships to Tsingtao when the Russian Second Pacific Squadron approached the area; following the Battle of Tsushima, where the Russian squadron was annihilated, the German vessels resumed training activities. Later in the year, both Seeadler and Thetis were sent to German East Africa to suppress a rebellion against German rule. By August, a floating dry dock had been completed in Tsingtao, allowing the East Asia Squadron to repair its ships itself; Fürst Bismarck underwent repairs there in October. On 11 November, KAdm Alfred Breusing relieved Prittwitz und Gaffron as commander of the squadron, and in December embarked on a tour of the southern portion of the East Asia Station, though the cruise had to be cut short due to unrest in Shanghai that necessitated Fürst Bismarcks presence there. The men patrolled the city center and protected the German consulate, but did not take any active role in the unrest.

1906–1908
In January 1906, Fürst Bismarck began a tour of Indonesia, after which she went to Hong Kong via North Borneo in late February. She remained there for almost a month, departing on 23 March to meet the rest of the squadron, which by then could be withdrawn from Shanghai. Fürst Bismarck and Hansa, the only major warships assigned to the squadron by that time, visited Japanese ports in May. On 28 May, Fürst Bismarck went to Taku, where Breusing and his staff traveled overland to Peking, the first German naval officers to visit the Guangxu Emperor and Empress Dowager Cixi after the Boxer Rebellion. Hansa began the voyage back to Germany on 4 July, and on 9 August, the light cruiser  arrived to join the squadron. On 19 November, the light cruiser  arrived to further strengthen the squadron. Fürst Bismarck and Tiger went on another tour of Indonesia and Japan in early 1907. On 13 May, KAdm Carl von Coerper arrived to replace Breusing; he began his tenure as squadron commander by boarding Tiger for a cruise into the Yangtze to familiarize himself with German economic interests in the area. After returning to Fürst Bismarck, he visited Japan in company with Niobe. During the squadron maneuvers that year, Fürst Bismarck won the Schießpreis for a fourth time.

The light cruiser  joined the squadron on 23 October, finally bringing the strength of the unit back to its prescribed four cruisers. In January 1908, Fürst Bismarck steamed to Siam, where she was visited by the King of Siam. The rest of the year passed uneventfully for Fürst Bismarck, and in early 1909 she received orders to return to Germany for repairs. The scale of work necessary for the ship, which had been abroad for nine years, was greater than could be done in the floating dock in Tsingtao and it would have been too expensive to do elsewhere in Asia. On 8 April, she began the voyage home and she rendezvoused with the new flagship of the East Asia Squadron, the armored cruiser , in Colombo on 29 April. Fürst Bismarck arrived in Kiel on 13 June, where she was decommissioned on 26 June.

Later career
In 1910, Fürst Bismarck was taken into the shipyard at the Kaiserliche Werft in Kiel for an extensive modernization. Part of the work also included converting the ship into a torpedo training ship to replace the old ironclad . Her heavy fighting masts were replaced with lighter pole masts and her two aft-most 15 cm turrets were removed. The work lasted for four years, and was completed shortly after the outbreak of World War I in July 1914. On 28 November, Fürst Bismarck was recommissioned under the command of  KzS—Captain at Sea) Ferdinand Bertram, the former head of the artillery school. She initially completed sea trials, but owing to her low combat value was not assigned to a front-line unit. Instead, she was allocated to I Marine Inspectorate based in Kiel for use as a training ship. From 4 to 6 September 1916, she was disarmed, and from 1917 she was also used to train commanders for the Type U-151 cruiser submarines and the navy's zeppelins. She was decommissioned on 31 December 1918 after the end of the war, though she remained in the fleet's inventory into mid-1919. She served as a floating office until 27 May before being stricken from the naval register on 17 June.

Notes

Footnotes

Citations

References

Further reading
 

Cruisers of the Imperial German Navy
Ships built in Kiel
1897 ships
World War I cruisers of Germany